Shell USA, Inc. (formerly Shell Oil Company, Inc.)  is the United States-based wholly owned subsidiary of Shell plc, a UK-based transnational corporation "oil major" which is amongst the largest oil companies in the world. Approximately 18,000 Shell employees are based in the U.S. Its U.S. headquarters are in Houston, Texas. Shell USA, including its consolidated companies and its share in equity companies, is one of America's largest oil and natural gas producers, natural gas marketers, gasoline marketers and petrochemical manufacturers.

History
In 1997, Shell and Texaco entered into two refining/marketing joint ventures. One combined their Midwestern and Western operations and was known as Equilon. The other, known as Motiva Enterprises, combined the Eastern and Gulf Coast operations of Shell Oil and Star Enterprise, itself a joint venture between Saudi Aramco and Texaco.

After Texaco merged with Chevron in 2001, Shell purchased Texaco's shares in the joint ventures. In 2002, Shell began converting these Texaco stations to the Shell brand, a process that was to be completed by June 2004 and was called "the largest retail re-branding initiative in American business history". In the year 2016, Shell Nederland Raffinaderij BV (Shell Pernis) said that it has started a new aromatics unit at the large Pernis refinery in Rotterdam, Netherlands.

In recent years The Shell Oil Company's Midstream, and Downstream, in particular, have become limited to petroleum, and chemical products. This has come as a result of Royal Dutch Shell breaking off its Natural Gas and power businesses into a new segment named Integrated Gas. The Shell Oil Company's former Natural Gas, and energy divisions are now Shell Energy North America, a closely integrated, but a distinctive entity that runs across North America and is headquartered out of Houston.

Activities
Shell is the market leader through approximately 14,000 Shell-branded gas stations in the U.S. which also serve as Shell's most visible public presence, and comes closest to serving all 50 states, lacking a presence only in Montana. At its gas stations Shell provides diesel fuel, gasoline and LPG. Shell Oil Company was a 50/50 partner with the Saudi Arabian government-owned oil company Saudi Aramco in Motiva Enterprises, a refining and marketing joint venture which owns and operates three oil refineries on the Gulf Coast of the United States. However, Shell is currently divesting its interest in Motiva.

Shell products include oils, fuels, and car services as well as exploration, production, and refining of petroleum products. The Shell Oil Refinery in Martinez, California, the first Shell refinery in the United States, supplies Shell and Texaco stations in the West and Midwest.

Shell gasoline previously included the RU2000 and SU2000 lines (later there was a SU2000E) but they have been superseded by the V-Power line.

Relationship with Shell plc

Until the mid-1980s Shell's business in the United States was substantially independent. Limited direct involvement from the main office in The Hague, Netherlands, and having its stock "Shell Oil" traded on the New York Stock Exchange were factors. However, in 1984, Royal Dutch Shell made a bid to purchase those shares of Shell Oil Company it did not own (around 30%) and despite some opposition from some minority shareholders which led to a court case, Shell completed the buyout for a sum of $5.7 billion.

Despite the acquisition, however, Shell Oil remained a fairly independent business. This was due in part to complex legal reasons as Royal Dutch Shell feared that there could be onerous liability problems if a closer control of Shell Oil's affairs was exercised by the "parent company". One consequence of this independence was that the Shell logo used in the U.S. was slightly different from that used in the rest of the world. In the 1980s Shell Oil's independence began to gradually erode as the "parent company" took a more hands-on approach in running the business. The logo used in the United States is the same as that used elsewhere since June 1, 1998.

In January 2018, Royal Dutch Shell acquired a 44% interest in solar energy company Silicon Ranch, run by CEO Matt Kisber. The takeover was part of the global New Energies project, with the aim of bringing solar renewable options to US customers. The company paid up to an estimated $217 million to take over from former minority shareholders Partners Group.

In October 2018, the company installed a 285-foot-high quench tower at the Shell Chemical Appalachia L.L.C. Pittsburgh plant, which transfers heat absorbed by the water circulation process to use across other areas of the site.

Subsidiaries
Aera Energy —joint venture with ExxonMobil operating in California.
Shell Development Emeryville —research facility that operated from 1928 to 1966 in California.
Pennzoil Quaker State
Jiffy Lube
Deer Park
Limejump
Greenlots - charging stations and systems provider for others like Electrify America
Amilcar Petroleum Operations (APO) — a joint venture with the state-owned petroleum company in Tunisia Entreprise Tunisienne d'Activités Pétrolières created on July 1, 2014.

Legal issues

Environmental

Shell Puget Sound Refinery, Anacortes, Washington, was fined $291,000 from 2006 to 2010 for violations of the Clean Air Act making it the second most-fined violator in the Pacific Northwest. , it was listed as "high priority violator" since 2008.

In 2008, a lawsuit was filed against Shell Oil Company for alleged Clean Air Act violation. Shell Deer Park facility, 20 miles east of Houston, was the nation's eighth-largest oil refinery and one of the world's largest petrochemical producers. The facility was also the second-largest source of air pollution in Harris County, which ranked among the lowest in the nation in several measures of air quality.  According to Sierra Club and Environment Texas, analysis of Shell's reports to the Texas Commission on Environmental Quality, air pollutants released at Deer Park since 2003 exceeded the EPA's emissions limits.

Will Oremus from Slate magazine states, "The company's business depends on being able to anticipate and respond quickly to seismic shifts in the energy market. So it employs a team of big-thinking futurists, called scenario planners, to keep it a step ahead. In 2008 the company released a fresh pair of scenarios for how the world might respond to climate change over the coming decades. Both were predicated on what the company called 'three hard truths': that global energy demand is rising, that the supply of conventional energy will not be able to keep up, and that climate change is both real and dangerous."

Polybutylene lawsuit
Between 1978 and 1995, Shell Oil produced polybutylene pipes, which corrode when exposed to chlorine. A class action lawsuit was filed in 1995 against Shell Oil when the polybutylene pipes caused flooding in many households in the U.S. and Canada.  The settlement required Shell Oil to pay for the re-installation of piping for millions of houses for claims filed through May 2009.

Campaign violations
About 6,000 Shell workers and contractors were instructed to attend a Trump speech held on August 13, 2019, or take the day off without pay, losing about $700 from overtime and per diem. During his address, Trump called out specific union leaders to declare their voting loyalty. Many of the union leaders present were not consulted prior to the event and memos sent to contractor management forbade any protest. Federal law prohibits a corporation from making a contribution.

See also

Pennsylvania Shell ethylene cracker plant
Petroleum geology
Fred Meissner, Shell Laboratories, Petroleum Explorationist, Professor Colorado School of Mines
M. King Hubbert, Shell Laboratories, Petroleum Geologist, created the Hubbert peak theory model of oil depletion
 Geophysics

References

External links
 
 
 

Shell plc subsidiaries
Shell
Oil companies of the United States
Retail companies established in 1912
Energy companies established in 1912
Non-renewable resource companies established in 1912
Companies based in Houston
Gas stations in the United States
American subsidiaries of foreign companies
1912 establishments in Texas
Oil and gas companies of Turkey
American companies established in 1912